Rothia may refer to
 Rothia (plant) Pers. 1807, a genus of legumes in the family Fabaceae
 Rothia Schreb. 1791, an illegitimate synonym of the aster genus, Andryala
 Rothia Borkh. 1792, an illegitimate synonym of the grass genus, Mibora
 Rothia Lam. 1792, an illegitimate synonym of the aster genus, Schkuhria
 Rothia (moth) Westwood, 1877, a genus of moths in the family Noctuidae
 Rothia (bacterium) Georg and Brown 1967, a genus of bacteria in the family Micrococcaceae